Syed Shah Nasiruddin was a Sufi saint and military leader associated with the spread of Islam in Bengal in the 14th century. As the commander of the armed forces (Sipah Salar) of Sultan Shamsuddin Firoz Shah, Syed Nasiruddin is primarily known for his role in the Conquest of Sylhet in 1303, alongside the celebrated Sufi dervish Shah Jalal.

Birth and lineage

Nasiruddin was born into a Syed family in Baghdad, the son of Hasan al-Arabi (Hasan the Arab). Historian Achyut Charan Choudhury traces Nasiruddin's descent from the Twelve Imams of Shia Islam, claiming his lineage to be as follows:

Syed Nasiruddin, Siphah Salar son of Hasan Arabi son of Khwaja Daud son of Khwaja Abul Fazal son of Khwaja Abul Farah son of Muhammad al-Mahdi son of Hasan al-Askari son of Ali an-Naqi son of Muhammad al-Taqi son of Ali al-Ridha son of Musa al-Kadhim son of Ja'far al-Sadiq son of Muhammad al-Baqir son of Zayn al-Abidin son of Hazrat Husayn son of Hazrat Ali.
These claims of Sayyid ancestry are extremely dubious, and it was very common for indigenous people of high positions within government to claim foreign ancestry to raise their stature in society.

Conquest of Sylhet

At some point, he became a follower of the Suhrawardiyya Sufi Order and was attributed with a number of supernatural abilities. It is perhaps through these stories of spiritual powers that he gained the patronage of the Sultan of Bengal, Shamsuddin Firoz Shah.

By 1303, Syed Nasiruddin had become the Sipah Salar of the Sultan's army. During this time, Firoz Shah was involved in a war with the Hindu king of Sylhet, Gour Govinda. Two unsuccessful attacks against Govinda had already been attempted by the Sultan's army, led by his nephew Sikander Khan. A third strike, now also under the leadership of Syed Nasiruddin was ordered. This army was later joined by the forces of Shah Jalal and his 360 followers. This attack ultimately proved successful and Gour Govinda was forced to retreat, thereby bringing Sylhet under Muslim control.

Capture of Taraf

Soon after the conquest of Sylhet, word was received of the execution of a local Qadi by Achak Narayan, the ruler of the neighbouring kingdom of Taraf in present-day Habiganj. This was done in response to the Qadi, who was called Nuruddin, sacrificing a cow in celebration of his son's marriage, an action which offended the king.

Syed Nasiruddin was dispatched with a contingent of soldiers as well as twelve of Shah Jalal's followers against Narayan, who fled with his family upon learning of the advance. Taraf was easily captured as a result, with Nasiruddin being subsequently appointed as its governor. He then attempted to console the family of the late Qadi by giving his own son, Syed Sirajuddin, in marriage to Nuruddin's daughter.

Legacy
Upon his death, Syed Nasiruddin was buried in Murarband, Taraf, with his grave later becoming a shrine (mazar). His family subsequently continued as hereditary rulers of the area.

See also 
 Syed Ibrahim Danishmand

References

People from Chunarughat Upazila
14th-century Indian Muslims
Indian people of Arab descent
Indian people of Iraqi descent
Bengali Sufi saints